Germans Māliņš (born 12 October 1987) is a Latvian professional footballer, currently playing for JDFS Alberts.

Club career

Skonto Riga

Born in Riga, as a youth player Māliņš played for his local club FK Auda, before moving to JFC Skonto in 2001. He spent 5 years in the academy, being taken to the club's first team in 2006 as the third choice keeper. In the beginning of 2007 he was given out on loan to Olimps in order to gain experience. During the loan spell Māliņš made his debut in the Latvian Higher League and became the club's first choice keeper. He returned to Skonto for the 2008 season, serving as the back-up keeper for Pāvels Doroševs. Māliņš started the 2009 season as the first-choice keeper, but after the arrival of Aleksandrs Vlasovs from SK Blāzma was once again put on the bench. From 2010 to 2011 he was mainly used as the reserve keeper, with Kaspars Ikstens in the goal. On 27 April 2011, during a league match against Daugava Daugavpils, Ikstens was seriously injured and was out for the rest of the season, with Māliņš immediately filling his place. On 18 June 2011 he helped his team become the champions of the Baltic League, beating FK Ventspils in penalties. On 13 August 2011 Māliņš secured his club a late 1-1 draw in a league match against FC Jūrmala, scoring a goal with a header after a corner kick in the 94th minute. After several outstanding performances he was named the keeper of the season by Latvian Football Federation. In 2012 Māliņš appeared in 39 matches as the team's captain, helping Skonto finish the championship as the runners-up and win the Latvian Cup. He was named the goalkeeper of the season for the second year in a row.

BATE Borisov

In February 2013 Māliņš went on trial with the Belarusian Premier League champions BATE Borisov and signed a one-year contract with them in March 2013. Since then he was mainly used as the back-up keeper for Andrey Harbunow. Māliņš made his debut for the club on 3 August 2013 in a 5-1 league match victory over Naftan Novopolotsk, playing all 90 minutes and conceding a goal from the penalty spot. In 2013, he helped BATE win the Belarus Premier League. On 29 December 2013 it was announced that Māliņš had extended his contract with BATE.

FK Jelgava
Māliņš joined FK Jelgava on 1 January 2019.

JDFS Alberts
After a spell in Sweden, Māliņš joined JDFS Alberts in 2021.

International career

Māliņš has represented Latvia at U17 and U19 levels. He was called up to the Latvia national football team for a friendly match against Armenia on 11 February 2009, but did not join the squad due to his father's death. His second call-up came 2 years later, as he was an unused substitute in a friendly match against Finland on 10 August 2011. Māliņš has yet to make his first full international appearance for Latvia, as he is currently the third-choice keeper for the team.

Honours

Skonto Riga
 Latvian Higher League champion
 2010
 Baltic League champion
 2011
 Latvian Cup winner
 2012
 Latvian Higher League keeper of the season
 2011, 2012

BATE Borisov
 Belarus Premier League champion 2013, 2014Belarus Supercup 2014

Latvia
 Baltic Cup winner'''
 2012

References

External links 
 
 Profile at BATE website
 Profile at Svensk Fotboll

1987 births
Living people
Footballers from Riga
Latvian footballers
Association football goalkeepers
Latvian expatriate footballers
Skonto FC players
JFK Olimps players
FC BATE Borisov players
FK RFS players
Riga FC players
FK Jelgava players
Latvian expatriate sportspeople in Belarus
Latvian expatriate sportspeople in Sweden
Expatriate footballers in Belarus
Expatriate footballers in Sweden